Century Motor Vehicle Company (1899–1903) was a manufacturer of electric and steam automobiles in Syracuse, New York. The company switched to gasoline-fuelled internal combustion engine-powered  automobiles in January 1903, and went out of business later that year.

It is not to be confused with Century, a British motor company that produced cars until 1907.

Advertisements

References

External links 

 The Century Steam Car & The Century Motor Vehicle Co.
 Early American Automobiles, 1904 models

Motor vehicle manufacturers based in Syracuse, New York
Defunct motor vehicle manufacturers of the United States
Vintage vehicles
Veteran vehicles
1900s cars
American companies established in 1899
Vehicle manufacturing companies established in 1899
Vehicle manufacturing companies disestablished in 1903
1899 establishments in New York (state)
1903 disestablishments in New York (state)
Defunct companies based in Syracuse, New York